Xujiang Subdistrict is a former subdistrict of Gusu District, Suzhou, Jiangsu, China. The subdistrict was abolished on March 24, 2017 when it was merged into Canglang Subdistrict.

Administrative divisions 
As of 2016, shortly before its abolition, Xujiang Subdistrict administered 8 residential communities.

 Wannian Community
 Sanxiang Community
 Tainan Community
 Xujiang Community
 Xuhong Community
 Xincang Community
 Tongjing First Community
 Tongjing Second Community

See also
Canglang Subdistrict
List of township-level divisions of Suzhou

References

Gusu District

Former township-level divisions of Suzhou